The 2012–13 Premijer Liga season is the twenty-second since its establishment.

Teams

Regular season

Standings

Source: rukometstat.com

Championship Playoffs

Standings

Pld - Played; W - Won; L - Lost; PF - Points for; PA - Points against; Diff - Difference; Pts - Points.

Mid-Table Playoffs

Pld - Played; W - Won; L - Lost; PF - Points for; PA - Points against; Diff - Difference; Pts - Points.

Relegation play-offs

Pld - Played; W - Won; L - Lost; PF - Points for; PA - Points against; Diff - Difference; Pts - Points.

Final table 

Pld - Played; W - Won; L - Lost; PF - Points for; PA - Points against; Diff - Difference; Pts - Points.

2012-13 winning team

RK Croatia Osiguranje Zagreb
GK: Ivan Stevanović, Filip Ivić
LB: Tonči Valčić, Stipe Mandalinić, Marko Matić, Domagoj Sršen
CB: Josip Valčić, David Špiler, Luka Ćosić
RB: Luka Stepančić, Luka Šebetić
RW: Zlatko Horvat, Jerko Matulić, Bruno Butorac, Lovro Šprem
LW: Hrvoje Batinović, Lovro Mihić
LP: Marino Marić, Ilija Brozović
Head coach: Boris Dvoršek
Source: rukometstat.com

References

Sources
HRS
Sport.net.hr
Rk-zamet.hr
Rijeka.hr

Croatian Premier Handball League seasons
2012–13 domestic handball leagues
2012 in Croatian sport
2013 in Croatian sport